Pataveh (also Romanized as Pātāveh; also known as Pāy-e Ţāveh) is a village in Olya Tayeb Rural District, in the Central District of Landeh County, Kohgiluyeh and Boyer-Ahmad Province, Iran. At the 2011 census, its population was 2,314.

References 

Populated places in Landeh County